Sim or SIM may refer to:

Computing and technology
SIM card or Subscriber Identity Module, used by mobile telephones
HP Systems Insight Manager, a system management tool
 Scientific instrument module in the Apollo command and service module
Security information management in computer security
Selected ion monitoring, a mass spectrometry scanning mode
Computer simulation
Space Interferometry Mission, cancelled by NASA

Organizations
Service de sécurité incendie de Montréal
Scuola Italiana di Montevideo, the Italian day school of Montevideo, Uruguay
Serving In Mission (formerly Sudan Interior Mission), a Christian mission organization
Servicio de Inteligencia Militar, a former Dominican intelligence service
Servicio de investigación Militar, a former Spanish military intelligence service
Servizio Informazioni Militari, a former Italian military intelligence service
Singapore Institute of Management
Society for Industrial Microbiology and Biotechnology
Society for Information Management

People
Sim (Korean surname)
Sim (Scottish surname)
Shěn (surname), a Chinese surname
Sim Wong Hoo (born 1955), founder of Creative Technology
Desmond Sim (born 1961), Singaporean playwright
Sim (actor) (1926–2009), French actor, humourist, writer and comedian

Places
Sım, a village and municipality in Azerbaijan
Sim (river), in Russia
Sim, Russia, several inhabited localities

Pop culture
Sim (album), 2017, by Vanessa da Mata
SiM (band), a Japanese rock band
SIM (film), 2013
Sim (pencil game)

Transport
 Simei MRT station, Singapore, MRT station abbreviation
 Simi Valley station, California, Amtrak station code

Other uses
Siberian International Marathon
, the driving license in Indonesia

See also
Simsim (disambiguation)
Sim4, a bioinformatics sequence alignment program
SIM-VIII, 1931 Yugoslav airplane
Sims (disambiguation)

Simm (disambiguation)
Simming, the act of playing an online roleplaying game